Kim Ki-bang (born May 31, 1981) is a South Korean actor. Since his acting debut in 2005, Kim has played supporting roles in television dramas such as Boys Over Flowers (2009), Golden Time (2012), Gu Family Book (2013), Medical Top Team (2013), My Lovely Girl (2014), and Heart to Heart (2015). He played his first leading role in the film Geochang Massacre - Bloody Winter (2013).

Personal life
On June 22, 2017, Kim's agency, Mystic Entertainment, announced that he will get married with Kim Hee-kyung, South Korean cosmetic brand Ground Plan's vice president. The wedding ceremony was held in Hannam-dong, Yongsan, Seoul on September 30, 2017.

Filmography

Film

Television series

Web series

Variety show

Music video

Theater

References

External links
 at Family Actors Entertainment 
 

1981 births
Living people
Mystic Entertainment artists
South Korean male film actors
South Korean male television actors
South Korean male musical theatre actors
21st-century South Korean male actors